The 35 mm grenade is a type of grenade launcher ammunition of Chinese origin.

History
Thirty-five millimeter grenades are proprietary designs originating from China. In the 1980s, China began to experiment with different types of grenade launchers. Chinese designers felt Soviet 30 mm grenades had inadequate firepower, while NATO 40 mm grenades lacked portability, resulting in the adoption of 35 mm grenades for their grenade launchers, such as the QLZ-87 and QLZ-04.

Grenade types

35 mm high velocity

35x32 mm Type 87

The 35 mm Type 87 is a series of high velocity grenades designed for Type 87 grenade launcher and other automatic grenade launchers. The grenades are stabilized with spin rifling. The Type 87 has a typical grenade design with the propellant stored in the base, the warhead in the middle part and the fuse in the nose section. The grenade is semi-rimmed with relatively short cases.

The shells can be stored in ammo box or attached to a belt. In additional to the Type 87, the ammo can also be used by Type 04 automatic grenade launchers. QLB-06, also known as the QLZ-87B, is an improved version of the Type 87 grenade launcher and shares ammunition. 

Various warhead types are available for 35x32mm Type 87:
 DFS-87: Anti-personnel fragmentation grenade with HE-frag warhead.
 DFJ-87: Dual purpose, Armor-piercing grenade with HEAT warhead.
 DFR-87: Incendiary grenade.
 DFN-87: Anti-personnel fragmentation incendiary grenade.
 DFD-87: Smoke/marker grenade, with colored smoke. 

Type 87 cartridge Specification:
 Weight: 217—250g
 Muzzle velocity: 190m/s 
 Maximum range: 1750m
 Blast radius: 11m
 Penetration: 80 mm of RHA.

35x32mm Type 11
QLU-11 utilizes a new version of the 35x32mm (through old types are compatible). New ammunition is specifically designed for long range accuracy. Type 11 long range cartridge is derived from the DFJ-87 armor-piercing grenade, but the weight is reduced from 217  to 200 g due to lighter casings. Propellant takes a larger percentage of the cartridge space, thus improving the velocity from 195  to 320 m/s. This modification greatly increases the recoil, which QLU-11 features advanced primer ignition (API) blowback to mitigate.

35 mm low velocity

35x115mm Type 91
The 35x115mm Type 91 grenade is a series of low velocity grenades designed for the Type 91 grenade launcher, which comes with shoulder-launched, rifle-attached, and vehicle-mounted variants. The cartridge has a conventional design for breech loading similar to NATO 40 mm low velocity grenades.

Various warhead types are available for 35x115 mm Type 91, including but not limited to:
DFB-91: Stun grenade
DFT-91: Sting grenade.
DFR-91: Paintball grenade
DFC-91: Tear gas
DFG-91: Flashbang

35 mmCL Type 10
The Type 10 is a series of low-velocity grenades designed for the QLG-10 and QLG-10A rifle-attached grenade launchers. Standard Type 10 projectiles are caseless, and weigh 169 grams with muzzle velocities of 78 meters per second. Type 10 grenades utilize high-low cartridges designed for low recoil operation with extended range. The grenade has an effective range of 400 meters.

Various warhead types are available for the 35 mmCL Type 10, include but are not limited to: 
 DFS-10: High-explosive fragmentation grenade. Effective against infantry personal inside  range. 
 DFS-10A: Bouncing air-burst fragmentation grenade with  range. Equipped with pre-set airburst munition and jump-up detonation fuse, similar to the US M397A1 40 mm cartridge.
 DFJ-10: High-explosive dual purpose grenade that is effective against infantry personnel inside a  range, as well as against light vehicles in a  range.
 DFX-10: Trajectory marker grenade with  range,  can be used for trajectory adjustment for other grenade types.
 DFD-10: Smoke grenade with  range, with colored smoke available.

See also
 List of equipment of the People's Liberation Army Ground Force
 United States 40 mm grenades

References

Weapons of the People's Republic of China
Large-caliber cartridges